Os Quatro e Meia (loose translation: "The Four and A Half") are a band from Coimbra, Portugal. The band emerged in 2013, after a successful performance by a group of university students from Coimbra in a show to raise funds for a dance academy. The group is currently composed of six elements: João Cristóvão (violin and mandolin), Mário Ferreira (accordion and voice), Pedro Figueiredo (percussion), Ricardo Almeida (voice and guitar), Rui Marques (double bass) and Tiago Nogueira (voice and guitar). All of them have, besides music, another profession: there are three doctors (Pedro, Ricardo and Tiago), a computer engineer (Mário), a civil engineer (Rui) and a music teacher (João). In 2017, the sextet started to achieve nationwide recognition and became one of the most famous bands in Portugal.

See also
List of number-one albums of 2017 (Portugal)
List of number-one albums of 2020 (Portugal)

References

External links
Official website

Portuguese musical groups
2013 establishments in Portugal
Musical groups established in 2013
Culture in Coimbra
Sextets